Marko Mijatović (born 2 July 1988) is a Serbian football midfielder.

Club career
After playing for OFK Bar in Montenegro, he moved in Belgrade, in club with the same name. Later, he played for Lushnja in Albanian First Division, Sloga Kraljevo, and Slavija Sarajevo in 2012.

References

External links
 
 Marko Mijatović video presentation

1988 births
Living people
People from Kotor
Association football midfielders
Serbian footballers
OFK Bar players
FK Sloga Kraljevo players
Serbian First League players
Serbian expatriate footballers
Serbian expatriate sportspeople in Albania
Expatriate footballers in Albania
KS Lushnja players
FK Slavija Sarajevo players